A reglet is a piece of wooden spacing material used in typesetting, usually to provide spacing between paragraphs, though it is sometimes used to fill in small spaces not taken up by type in the chase.

Notes

See also
 Slug (typesetting)

Typesetting